On-base plus slugging (OPS) is a sabermetric baseball statistic calculated as the sum of a player's on-base percentage and slugging percentage. The ability of a player both to get on base and to hit for power, two important offensive skills, are represented. An OPS of .800 or higher in Major League Baseball puts the player in the upper echelon of hitters. Typically, the league leader in OPS will score near, and sometimes above, the 1.000 mark.

Equation
The basic equation is

where OBP is on-base percentage and SLG is slugging average. These averages are defined below as:

- the numerator "H + BB +HBP" effectively means "number of trips to first base at least"

- the denominator "AB + BB + SF + HBP" effectively means "total plate appearances", but does not include sacrifice bunts

This is because though a batter makes a trip to the plate he is not given an "AB" when he walks (BB or HBP) or when he hits the ball into play and is called out, but the action allows a run to score (SF). As a result, the 4 counts (AB + BB + SF +HBP) are needed to calculate a batter's total trips to the plate.

and

where:
 H = hits
 BB = bases on balls
 HBP = times hit by pitch
 AB = at bats
 SF = sacrifice flies
 TB = total bases

In one equation, OPS can be represented as:

History
On-base plus slugging was first popularized in 1984 by John Thorn and Pete Palmer's book, The Hidden Game of Baseball. The New York Times then began carrying the leaders in this statistic in its weekly "By the Numbers" box, a feature that continued for four years. Baseball journalist Peter Gammons used and evangelized the statistic, and other writers and broadcasters picked it up. The popularity of OPS gradually spread, and by 2004 it began appearing on Topps baseball cards.

OPS was formerly sometimes known as production. For instance, production was included in early versions of Thorn's Total Baseball encyclopedia, and in the Strat-O-Matic Computer Baseball game. This term has fallen out of use.

OPS gained popularity because of the availability of its components, OBP and SLG, and that team OPS correlates well with team runs scored.

An OPS scale
Bill James, in his essay titled "The 96 Families of Hitters" uses seven different categories for classification by OPS:

This effectively transforms OPS into a seven-point ordinal scale. Substituting quality labels such as excellent (A), very good (B), good (C), average (D), fair (E), poor (F) and very poor (G) for the A–G categories creates a subjective reference for OPS values.

Leaders

The top ten Major League Baseball players in lifetime OPS, with at least 3,000 plate appearances through August 5, 2020, were:

 Babe Ruth, 1.1636
 Ted Williams, 1.1155
 Lou Gehrig, 1.0798
 Barry Bonds, 1.0512
 Jimmie Foxx, 1.0376
 Hank Greenberg, 1.0169
 Rogers Hornsby, 1.0103
 Mike Trout, 1.0009
 Manny Ramirez, 0.9960
 Mark McGwire, 0.9823

The top four were all left-handed batters. Jimmie Foxx has the highest career OPS for a right-handed batter.

The top ten single-season performances in MLB are (all left-handed hitters):

 Barry Bonds, 1.4217
 Barry Bonds, 1.3807
 Babe Ruth, 1.3791
 Barry Bonds, 1.3785
 Babe Ruth, 1.3586
 Babe Ruth, 1.3089
 Ted Williams, 1.2875
 Barry Bonds, 1.2778
 Babe Ruth, 1.2582
 Ted Williams, 1.2566

Adjusted OPS (OPS+)
OPS+, adjusted OPS, is a closely related statistic. OPS+ is OPS adjusted for the park and the league in which the player played, but not for fielding position. An OPS+ of 100 is defined to be the league average. An OPS+ of 150 or more is excellent and 125 very good, while an OPS+ of 75 or below is poor.

The basic equation for OPS+ is

where *lgOBP is the park adjusted OBP of the league (not counting pitchers hitting) and *lgSLG is the park adjusted SLG of the league.

A common misconception is that OPS+ closely matches the ratio of a player's OPS to that of their league. In fact, due to the additive nature of the two components in OPS+, a player with an OBP and SLG both 50% better than league average in those metrics will have an OPS+ of 200 (twice the league average OPS+) while still having an OPS that is only 50% better than the average OPS of the league. It would be a better (although not exact) approximation to say that a player with an OPS+ of 150 produces 50% more runs, in a given set of plate appearances, as a player with an OPS+ of 100 (though see clarification above, under "History").

Leaders in OPS+
Through the end of the 2019 season, the career top twenty leaders in OPS+ (minimum 3,000 plate appearances) were:

Babe Ruth, 206
Ted Williams, 190
Barry Bonds, 182
Lou Gehrig, 179
Mike Trout, 176
Rogers Hornsby, 175
Mickey Mantle, 172
Dan Brouthers, 171
Joe Jackson, 170
Ty Cobb, 168
Pete Browning, 163
Jimmie Foxx, 163
Mark McGwire, 163
Dave Orr, 162
Stan Musial, 159
Hank Greenberg, 158
Johnny Mize, 158
Tris Speaker, 157
Dick Allen, 156
Willie Mays, 156
Frank Thomas 156

The only purely right-handed batters to appear on this list are Browning, Hornsby, Foxx, Orr, Trout, McGwire, Allen, Mays, and Thomas. Mantle is the only switch-hitter in the group.

The highest single-season performances were:

 Barry Bonds, 268
 Barry Bonds, 263
 Barry Bonds, 259
 Fred Dunlap, 258 (1884) *
 Babe Ruth, 256
 Babe Ruth, 239
 Babe Ruth, 239
 Ted Williams, 235
 Ted Williams, 233
 Ross Barnes, 231 (1876) **
 Barry Bonds, 231

* - Fred Dunlap's historic 1884 season came in the Union Association, which some baseball experts consider not to be a true major league.

** - Ross Barnes may have been aided by a rule that made a bunt fair if it first rolled in fair territory. He did not play nearly so well when this rule was removed, although injuries may have been mostly to blame, as his fielding statistics similarly declined.

If Dunlap's and Barnes' seasons were to be eliminated from the list, two other Ruth seasons (1926 and 1927) would be on the list. This would also eliminate the only right-handed batter in the list, Barnes.

Criticism
Despite its simple calculation, OPS is a controversial measurement. OPS weighs on-base percentage and slugging percentage equally. However, on-base percentage correlates better with scoring runs. Statistics such as wOBA build on this distinction using linear weights. Additionally, the components of OPS are not typically equal (league-average slugging percentages are usually 75–100 points higher than league-average on-base percentages). As a point of reference, the OPS for all of Major League Baseball in 2019 was .758.

See also

 Sabermetrics
 Gross production average

Notes

References
 
 

Batting statistics